Brunod is an Italian surname originated in the Aosta Valley. Notable people with the surname include:
Bruno Brunod (born 1962), Italian bicyclist
Dennis Brunod (born 1978), Italian ski mountaineer, mountain and skyrunner

Italian-language surnames